Bubble-net feeding is a feeding behavior engaged in by humpback whales and Bryde's whales. It is one of the few surface feeding behaviors that humpback whales are known to engage in. This type of feeding can be done alone or in groups with as many as twenty whales participating at once. Whales can also perform a similar method of surface feeding called "lunge feeding".

Humpback whales are migratory and only eat during half of the year. During this feeding season humpback whales actively feed for up to twenty-two hours a day. They do this so they can store enough fat reserves to live through their breeding season when they do not eat at all. Humpback whales typically spend summer months in feeding grounds with cooler waters that they return to every year. They have been documented feeding in areas such as Southeast Alaska and off the coast of Antarctica.

Method

Bubble-net feeding is a cooperative feeding method used by groups of humpback whales. This behavior is not instinctual, it is learned; not every population of humpbacks knows how to bubble net feed. Humpback whales use vocalizations to coordinate and efficiently execute the bubble net so they all can feed. As the group circles a school of small fish such as salmon, krill, or herring, they use a team effort to disorient and corral the fish into a "net" of bubbles. One whale will typically begin to exhale out of their blowhole at the school of fish to begin the process. More whales will then blow bubbles while continuing to circle their prey. The size of the net created can range from three to thirty meters in diameter. One whale will sound a feeding call, at which point all whales simultaneously swim upwards with mouths open to feed on the trapped fish. As the whales swim up to the surface to feed they can hold up to 15,000 gallons of sea water in their mouths. Humpback whales have 14 to 35 throat grooves that run from the top of the chin all the way down to the navel. These grooves allow the mouth to expand. When they swallow they stream the water out through their baleen as they ingest the fish. The fish that they ingest are also a source of hydration for them. Bubble netting is an advanced and necessary feeding method developed by humpback whales to feed multiple mouths at one time.

Humpback whales do not always feed in large groups. On their own, they feed using a similar method referred to as lunge feeding. It is similarly executed as the whale dives down beneath a school of fish and rises to the surface with its mouth wide open. Once it reaches the surface it swallows, separates the fish from the saltwater, and expectorates the excess water.

Theories
There has been some speculation about how fish are trapped in the net of bubbles. One study suggests that it is the acoustics from the exhalations from the whales that traps the fish. It is thought that within the circle it is silent but outside the sounds have such high intensity that it is nearly impossible for fish to escape.

There are also a multitude of theories behind why humpback whales use bubble netting as a feeding method. The earliest documentation of this feeding behavior was recorded in 1929 from the Norwegian Sea. They speculated that it was playful behavior between the whales and a form of socializing. Change in environmental factors over the years has also been discussed as a possibility behind why this feeding method was created. The most popular theory behind bubble net feeding is one of survival. After being hunted to near extinction it is believed that humpback whales developed this method of feeding so many whales as possible can feed in a short amount of time.

Diet
Humpback whales have a vertical throat roughly the size of a grapefruit. They cannot physically swallow anything larger than that. They are carnivores and primarily feed on small fish such as krill, juvenile salmon, and herring. They are also baleen whales, which means that they do not have teeth, so they must be able to eat things that they can swallow whole. They have several vertical grooves running down the length of their body so that they can hold large volumes of water and fish at one time.  They feed for up to twenty-two hours a day, taking in anywhere from 4,400-5,500 pounds (2.0-2.5 tons) of food per day. The only time they feed is during the summer months; in the winter, they live solely off fat reserves that they have stored. They are not able to feed in warmer waters such as Hawaii or Mexico because there is no adequate habitat for the fish that they consume. Cooler waters, such as those off Southeast Alaska, are teeming with fish, making this a prime feeding ground for humpback whales during their feeding season.

Setting
Bubble net feeding does not occur everywhere. Alaska's cold waters and the high amounts of sun exposure in the summer time produce food for humpbacks. Areas such as Antarctica and the North Pacific are host to diverse marine ecosystems that provide adequate feeding opportunities for humpback whales. Southeast Alaska, for example, is home to coastal glaciers that provide plentiful nutrients for suitable fish habitats. Areas with warmer waters such as Mexico and Hawaii where whales go to breed do not provide attractive habitats for fish which is why humpback whales rely on their fat reserves they have from their feeding season.

Ecotourism
Up until September 2016 humpback whales had been on the endangered species list since 1970 due to the massive whaling that occurred. The population has recovered due to enforced restrictions on whaling and the promotion of ecotourism. Whale watching companies can profit from taking tourists out to sea so they may observe humpback whale behaviors in their natural habitat, which can help promote conservation. There are strict rules enforced by the Coast Guard to help keep vessels from disrupting the whales natural behavior. As a general rule, boats are not allowed to come within three hundred yards of marine mammals. If a marine mammal does approach a vessel, it must shut down its engines immediately to prevent affecting the animal's behavior.
Bubble net feeding has become a key feature in the tourism industry. It is visually appealing and provides a good opportunity to learn about this species. Unfortunately it is also both a rare and unpredictable behavior. The nutrient rich waters that provide this feeding ground for the whales often does not have good visibility. The only indications of a bubble net occurring that can be sighted on the surface is a ring of bubbles coming up. It is also common to see birds flock to the area where the whales will feed hoping to catch the fish being brought to the surface.

While the population of humpback whales has been successful in making a comeback, there have been some concerns with how tourism has been affecting the whales and their natural environment. By taking people out on the water to view these animals it can be disruptive and have a negative impact on their behavior. The increase in human to cetaceans contact has resulted in short term behavior changes, this includes feeding methods. Research is still being done, but one of the potential results from this increase in interactions is having to find food in other habitats. The amount of noise that is emitted from vessels is disruptive to communications between humpbacks and affects their ability to bubble net feed.

References 

Whales
Eating behaviors